The 1958 Kansas State Wildcats football team represented Kansas State University in the 1958 NCAA University Division football season.  The team's head football coach was Bus Mertes.  The Wildcats played their home games in Memorial Stadium.  The Wildcats finished the season with a 3–7 record with a 2–4 record in conference play.  They finished in fifth place.  The Wildcats scored just 110 points and gave up 192 points.

Schedule

References

Kansas State
Kansas State Wildcats football seasons
Kansas State Wildcats football